Frances Cowells Schroth (April 11, 1893 – October 6, 1961) was an American competition swimmer, Olympic champion, and former world record-holder.  She represented the United States at the 1920 Summer Olympics in Antwerp, Belgium.   She won the gold medal as member of the first-place U.S. team in the 4×100-meter freestyle relay, together with Margaret Woodbridge, Irene Guest and Ethelda Bleibtrey.  The American relay team set a new world record of 5:11.6 in the event final.  Individually, she also won bronze medals for her third-place performances in the women's 100-meter freestyle (1:17.2) and the women's 300-meter freestyle (4:52.0).

Schroth was born in Toledo, Ohio.  She was married to George Schroth, an Olympic bronze medalist in water polo at the 1924 Summer Olympics.

See also
 List of Olympic medalists in swimming (women)
 World record progression 4 × 100 metres freestyle relay

References

External links

 

1893 births
1961 deaths
American female freestyle swimmers
World record setters in swimming
Olympic bronze medalists for the United States in swimming
Olympic gold medalists for the United States in swimming
Sportspeople from Toledo, Ohio
Swimmers at the 1920 Summer Olympics
Medalists at the 1920 Summer Olympics
20th-century American women
20th-century American people